Krężel may refer to the following places:
Krężel, Masovian Voivodeship (east-central Poland)
Krężel, Gryfice County in West Pomeranian Voivodeship (north-west Poland)
Krężel, Myślibórz County in West Pomeranian Voivodeship (north-west Poland)